Leah Song Richardson (born 1967/1968) is an American lawyer, legal scholar, and higher education administrator who is currently president of Colorado College. She was previously dean and a chancellor's professor of law of the University of California, Irvine School of Law.

In 2022, it was suggested by The Washington Post that Richardson was a possible Joe Biden Supreme Court candidate to succeed retiring Justice Stephen Breyer.

Education 
Richardson earned a Bachelor of Arts degree from Harvard University and a Juris Doctor from Yale Law School.

Career 
Prior to academia, Richardson worked as a public defender and was a partner at a criminal law firm. She was also an assistant counsel at the NAACP Legal Defense and Educational Fund.

Richardson assumed the role of UC Irvine School of Law's interim dean on July 1, 2017, replacing the school's founding dean, Erwin Chemerinsky. In January 2018, she was appointed the school's second dean. At the time of her appointment, she was the only woman of color to lead a top-30 law school. On December 9, 2020, Colorado College announced that Richardson had accepted the post of president of the college; she began her position on July 1, 2021. She is the first woman of color to serve as the school's president.

Writing and scholarship 
Richardson's research focuses on implicit bias, criminal procedure, criminal law, and law and social science. She has examined implicit bias and prejudice in artificial intelligence technology. She co-edited the book "The Constitution and the Future of Criminal Justice in America," with John T. Parry of Lewis and Clark College, Portland. The book was published in 2014 by Cambridge University Press.   

She is working on a forthcoming book examining the history of race in the United States, and implications for law and policy.

Awards 
Richardson received the Derrick Bell Award from the Association of American Law Schools in 2012. The award recognizes exceptional contributions to legal education through mentoring, teaching and scholarship.   

In 2018, she was named among "OC People of 2018" by OC Weekly.

Affiliations 
Richardson is a member of the American Law Institute and serves on the executive committee of the Association of American Law Schools.

References 

American legal scholars
Harvard University alumni
Living people
University of California, Irvine faculty
Yale Law School alumni
Year of birth missing (living people)